Arama River may refer to:

 Arama River (Bistrița)
 Aramá River, a river of Pará state in north-central Brazil

See also 
 Arama, name of several places